"Can't Get Used to Losing You" is a song written by Jerome "Doc" Pomus and Mort Shuman, first made popular by Andy Williams in a 1963 record release, which was a number-two hit in both the US and the UK.  Twenty years later, British band the Beat took a reggae re-arrangement to number three in the UK.

Andy Williams recording
"Can't Get Used to Losing You" was recorded by Andy Williams in December 1962 and released in 1963. It peaked at number two in both the US and the UK.  In the US, the single spent four weeks at number two on the Billboard Hot 100 chart (behind "He's So Fine" by the Chiffons and "I Will Follow Him" by Little Peggy March) and topped the Easy Listening chart for four weeks, peaking on both in April 1963.  Williams' recording peaked at number one on the Cashbox charts.  Williams' vocals on the song's verses were double-tracked in unison, and overdubbed on the choruses so the listener hears Andy singing harmony with himself. The song appears on an album entitled Days of Wine and Roses and Other TV Requests in North America and Can't Get Used to Losing You and Other Requests in the United Kingdom.

Charts

Other 1960s and 1970s covers
In 1963, Patti Page recorded a version, with strings background, as part of the Say Wonderful Things album.  In the same year, Paul Anka included it on the album Song I Wish I'd Written, and Julie London performed it on The Wonderful World of Julie London. Bobby Rydell did his rendition the same year. In 1965, Chad and Jeremy's cover appeared on their Before and After.

Dandy and the Israelites performed it as reggae in 1970, whilst Danny Ray released a ska version in 1976.

The Beat recording

The Beat (known as The English Beat in the USA) originally recorded their cover of "Can't Get Used to Losing You" as a track on their 1980 album I Just Can't Stop It.  It was not released as a single until three years later, just as the Beat announced that they were breaking up.  The single was remixed slightly from the album track, and became the band's fifth and final top ten UK hit, and their highest charting single release ever.

Elvis Costello, who singled out the song as his favorite Doc Pomus composition, had hoped to cover the song, but scrapped the idea after "the Beat beat me to it".

Charts

Other recordings
"Can't Get Used to Losing You" has been covered by Amen Corner, Madeline Bell, Julie London, Patti Page, Alton Ellis, Skeeter Davis, Bobby Darin, Paul Anka, Bobby Rydell, Renegade Soundwave, Percy Faith, and Chad & Jeremy.

In France Dick Rivers did it as "Je ne peux pas t'oublier", with French lyrics, in 1963; also that year, Pierre Lalonde recorded it in Canada. In France also that year Vic Laurens, label Mercury with french lyrics " Je ne peux pas t'oublier in 1963. Italian pop singer John Foster also recorded it in 1963 as "Eri Un Abitudine".

British singer Colour Girl had a number-31 hit with her UK garage version in 2000.

Beyoncé heavily sampled the song in "Hold Up", from her 2016 album Lemonade.

See also
List of number-one adult contemporary singles of 1963 (U.S.)

References
Citations

Sources

1962 songs
1963 singles
1983 singles
Songs with music by Mort Shuman
Songs with lyrics by Doc Pomus
Andy Williams songs
The Beat (British band) songs
Song recordings produced by Bob Sargeant
Cashbox number-one singles
Columbia Records singles
Pop ballads